The Lowest Pair is an American folk band consisting of dual banjoists, Kendl Winter and  Palmer T. Lee. Formed in 2013, the band takes its name from the poem by musician, John Hartford. The band is signed to Team Love Records.

Discography

 36¢ (2014)
 The Sacred Heart Sessions (2015)
 I Reckon I'm Fixin' on Kickin' Round to Pick a Little (2015)
 Uncertain as It Is Uneven (2016)
 Fern Girl And Ice Man (2016)
 The Perfect Plan (2020)

References

External links 
Official Website
Artist page on Team Love Records
 

Americana music groups
Bluegrass music
American indie folk groups
Musical groups established in 2013
American folk rock groups
American alternative country groups
2013 establishments in the United States